The Laser Competition was a sailing event on the program at the 1996 Summer Olympics that was held from 23 July to 31 July 1996, in Savannah, Georgia, United States. Points were awarded for placement in each race. Eleven races were scheduled and sailed. Each sailor had two discards.

Results

Daily standings

Conditions at the Laser course areas

Notes

References 
 
 
 

 
 

Laser
Laser (dinghy) competitions
Unisex sailing at the Summer Olympics